Hüsametli   is a village in Erdemli district of Mersin Province, Turkey. The population of the village was 416  as of 2012. There are traces of ancient civilizations around the village (See Üçayaklı ruins) But the village was founded in the early 1800s by a Turkmen chieftain named Hüsamettin. The economy of the village depends on agriculture. Traditional dry farming is now being replaced by irrigated farming. Main crops are beans and cucumber. The attitude of the village is 840 m. which makes its climate pretty cold during the winter. Along with agriculture, some inhabitants of the village make their living with cattle breeding which is a traditional occupation of the Turkmen people. The literacy in the village is high particularly in the new generation. There are 3 coffee-houses in the village where people gather to communicate in their leisure times.

References

Villages in Erdemli District